Jorge Castillejos (born 6 July 1951) is a Mexican fencer. He competed at the 1968 and 1972 Summer Olympics.

References

1951 births
Living people
Mexican male fencers
Olympic fencers of Mexico
Fencers at the 1968 Summer Olympics
Fencers at the 1972 Summer Olympics
Sportspeople from Veracruz
20th-century Mexican people